Empty is a 2006 Estonian drama film directed by Veiko Õunpuu and based on the Mati Unt's same-named story.

Awards:
 2006: Estonian Film Journalists' Association's award: Neitsi Maali (best film of the year)
 2006: Tallinn Black Nights Film Festival (Tallinn, Eesti), Scottish Leader Eesti Filmi Auhind
 2006: annual award by Cultural Endowment of Estonia (best film of the year)

Cast
 Rain Tolk as Mati
 Taavi Eelmaa as Eduard
 Maarja Jakobson as Helina
 Mirtel Pohla as Marina
 Juhan Ulfsak as Neighbour

References

External links
 
 Tühirand, entry in Estonian Film Database (EFIS)

2006 films
Estonian drama films
Estonian-language films
Estonian short films